The  John S. and Izola Lewis House, at 343 E. 720 S. in Orem, Utah, was built in 1938.  It was listed on the National Register of Historic Places in 1998.

It was built by John Lewis, a public schools administrator.

References

Houses in Orem, Utah
Houses on the National Register of Historic Places in Utah
Houses completed in 1938
National Register of Historic Places in Orem, Utah